Robert J. Otterman is a former member of the Ohio House of Representatives, representing the 45th District from 2001–2008, when he was replaced by his son, John Otterman.

References

Year of birth missing (living people)
Living people
Members of the Ohio House of Representatives
21st-century American politicians